Luis  Enrique Capurro Bautista (born May 1, 1961 in Esmeraldas, Ecuador) is a former football player. He played 100 games for the Ecuador national team

Club career
He began his career in Patria De Esmeraldas (Ecuador. He also played for Barcelona SC, Emelec, Patria de Guayaquil, Milagro Sport, Filanbanco, LDU Quito, Cerro Porteño of Paraguay and Racing Club of Argentina.

Capurro won two Ecuadorian league titles, in 1994 with Emelec and in 1997 with Barcelona SC.

His large moustache and regular appearances for the Ecuador national team helped him to get recognised around South America and he got his dream to play outside of Ecuador. He joined Cerro Porteño of Paraguay in 1993, later in his career he went Argentina to play for "La Academia" of Coco Basile, but soon returned to Ecuador.

Once retired he decided to live in New York City.
But his talent was still recognized even far from his native Ecuador. Luis Capurro was hired once again to play, this time for a Latin American League in Plainfield New Jersey. He captained Cosmos Futbol Club into its Second Championship.

Honours

Club
 Club Sport Emelec
 Serie A de Ecuador: 1993, 1994
 Barcelona SC
 Serie A de Ecuador: 1997
 LDU Quito
 Serie A de Ecuador: 1999

Nation
 Ecuador
 Korea Cup: 1995

See also
 List of men's footballers with 100 or more international caps

References

External links
International statistics at rsssf
Interview celebrating his 100 caps

1961 births
Living people
Sportspeople from Esmeraldas, Ecuador
Association football fullbacks
Ecuadorian footballers
Ecuador international footballers
1987 Copa América players
1989 Copa América players
1991 Copa América players
1993 Copa América players
1995 Copa América players
1997 Copa América players
C.S. Emelec footballers
Cerro Porteño players
Racing Club de Avellaneda footballers
Barcelona S.C. footballers
L.D.U. Quito footballers
FIFA Century Club
Ecuadorian expatriate footballers
Expatriate footballers in Argentina
Expatriate footballers in Paraguay